Methylcatechol may refer to:

 Guaiacol (O-methylcatechol)
 3-Methylcatechol
 4-Methylcatechol